The Mare d'Oursi is a small, shallow lake in Oudalan Province in northern Burkina Faso, close to the town of Oursi. It is included in the List of Ramsar wetlands of international importance.

References

Further reading

Lakes of Burkina Faso
Ramsar sites in Burkina Faso
Important Bird Areas of Burkina Faso